The Madrid–Sevilla high-speed line (NAFA or Nuevo Acceso Ferroviario a Andalucía) is a  Spanish railway line for high-speed traffic between Madrid and Seville. The first Spanish high-speed rail connection has been in use since 21 April 1992 at speeds up to 300 km/h (186 mph). Travel time between the two end points was reduced by over half.

At Córdoba the Madrid–Málaga high-speed rail line leaves the line from Madrid. At Seville the line is extended to Cádiz only for the Alvia service.

Routing

The line starts at Madrid-Atocha and runs over 31 bridges (total length ) and through 17 tunnels (total length , crossing the plains of the southern half of the Inner Plateau. The terminus of the line is the new railway station Santa Justa in Seville.

Technical details
The high-speed line was constructed at standard gauge, in contrast with the rest of the Spanish railway network. Voltage is 25 kV AC instead of 3000 V DC. Twelve transformers feed the overhead wires. Some  before the start and end points of the line, the line merges with local DC tracks.

The line was equipped with signalling standards that had been developed in the 80s for the German Hanover-Würzburg high-speed rail line and the Mannheim-Stuttgart high-speed rail line.

A further amount of €4.1 million has been spent on changes to the ASFA train safety system.

Between the railway stations along the line, passing stations and emergency stations are located (in Spanish: Puesto de adelantamiento y estacionamiento de trenes, abbr. PAET). These allow faster trains to overtake slower trains, and the parking of rescue trains. In addition, most of these stations have basic platforms that can be used to let passengers descend and change to buses in case of emergency.

Trains travel along the line at  during the sections of the track close to Madrid. They travel at  through the Sierra Morena region, possibly because the S/100 trains aren't pressure-sealed and this section includes many tunnels and also because of the tight curvatures in the Sierra Morena (occasionally dipping as low as ). As the necessary curvature increases in proportion to the square of the maximum velocity, the maximum safe speed for a curvature of  would be , assuming no tilting technology: - only the AVE Class 100, AVE Class 102 and AVE Class 103 run through the Sierra Morena section, of which only the AVE Class 102 has tilting technology. The trains slow down to approximately  when travelling through Ciudad Real station. They also have to slow down to  when travelling through Puertollano station because of the lack of a bypass route and tight curvatures in the station.

History 

On 11 October 1986 the Spanish government decided to build a new railway between Madrid and Seville. On 25 February 1988, the international tender for the acquisition of 24 high-speed trains AVE followed; these trains were ordered by 23 December 1988. The first train, based on the third generation of TGVs, was delivered on 10 October 1991.

In December 1988 it was decided to build the new line in standard gauge. Construction was ordered on 16 March 1989, and it lasted for 33 months; actual construction activity lasted only 24 months. Commercial use of the line commenced on 21 April 1992. In the first weeks, over 23 thousand passengers used the new trains - an occupancy rate of 81%.

On 20 April 1992, services started between Madrid and Seville. Non-stop travel time between the two cities were 2:45 hrs; with stops at Ciudad Real, Puertollano and Córdoba it was 2:55 hrs. In 1992, tickets cost around 50-70 euros in second class, in first class over 100 euros.

In 2014, a new station was added in Villanueva de Córdoba, between Córdoba and Puertollano, to improve accessibility of the Los Pedroches region. 

The line later received branches in Andalusia.

Impact 
The new railway line radically changed the modal split between Madrid and Seville. The share of air traffic decreased between 1991 and 1994 from 40% to 13%; the combined share of car and bus decreased from 44% to 36%. The share of railway traffic increased from 16% to 51%, while total traffic increased by 35%.

In 1997, some 4.4 million passengers travelled along the line; in 1998, 4.75 million. By 1999, trains transported over 4 times as many passengers as planes between Seville and Madrid.

Sources 
Hochgeschwindigkeitsverkehr in Spanien aufgenommen and Neubaustrecke Madrid–Sevilla in Betrieb, in: Eisenbahntechnische Rundschau, June 1992, page 354 f.

References

Further reading

External links 
LAV Madrid - Sevilla  on Ferropedia 

High-speed railway lines in Spain
Rail transport in Madrid
Railway lines opened in 1992
1992 establishments in Spain
Standard gauge railways in Spain